Spacemaster or Space Master may refer to:

 Joint European Master in Space Science and Technology or short SpaceMaster, an Erasmus Mundus programme in Europe
 Martin Marietta Spacemaster, Space Shuttle proposal
 Space Master, Italian electro-musical group of the 1990s
 Spacemaster, science fiction role-playing game
 Trusty Spacemaster, a small wheeled bicycle made by Trusty Manufacturing in the 1960s and 1970s
 Zeiss SpaceMaster, a planetarium projector